Martin Leonard Small (2 February 1920 – 11 October 2009) was an English footballer who played as an inside forward.

Small played league football for Gateshead between 1946 and 1952, scoring a total of 33 goals in 98 games in the league and FA Cup.

Sources

1920 births
2009 deaths
English footballers
Association football forwards
Gateshead F.C. players
English Football League players